Alison Chadwick-Onyszkiewicz (1942 – 17 October 1978) was a British climber, mountaineer, painter and lithography lecturer. She made the first ascent of Gasherbrum III, at the time the highest unclimbed mountain in the world. Chadwick-Onyszkiewicz died along with her climbing partner, Vera Watson, during an attempt on Annapurna I Central.

Early life
Chadwick-Onyszkiewicz was born in Birmingham and grew up in Cornwall. She studied at Slade School of Fine Arts in London where she learned to climb.

Climbing career
Chadwick-Onyszkiewicz's early climbs were in Wales, England and the Alps, making ascents of the North Pillar of Palü, the Triolet and Les Courtes. She was known for her cool head and early commitment to alpine style mountaineering, which involves moving quickly and independently towards summits, at a time when large siege style expeditions were more common.

In 1972, during the Polish expedition in Hindu Kush, she ascended both Aspe Safed and Noshaq. Based on these climbs, she was selected for the 1975 Polish Gasherbrum Expedition. It was initially designed as a women's only expedition to Gasherbrum III led by Wanda Rutkiewicz, but a simultaneous men's expedition to Gasherbrum II was refused a permit and the two merged. During this expedition she gained the British height record for women.

Following the height record, she was elected to membership of the Alpine Club, one of the first women to be so.

Despite these successes, the achievements of women's climbing continued to be downplayed, with critics noting the presence and contributions of men on female driven expeditions.

Annapurna

In 1978, she took part in the American Women's Himalayan Expedition to Annapurna, the tenth highest mountain in the world. It consisted of all female climbers, designed to give women the opportunity to climb a major peak at a time when they were often excluded from expeditions. Chadwick-Onyszkiewicz was one of the few non Americans, and was considered one of their best climbers. Annapurna had very few ascents at the time, and they found it to be more treacherous than anticipated, with multiple avalanches causing severe delays in their progress. It is now considered the world's most deadly mountain, with the highest death rate of any 8000er. During the expedition Chadwick-Onyszkiewicz noted "It's the most dangerous mountain I've been on" in a letter to her husband.

The expedition was successful, with Vera Komarkova, Irene Beardsley (formerly Miller), Mingma Tsering Sherpa and Chewang Ringjin Sherpa reaching the summit. However, Chadwick-Onyszkiewicz was keen for a female only team to succeed, so she and climbing partner Vera Watson made a second summit push to the unclimbed second peak. Since many of the climbers had already descended due to frostbite and sickness or were too exhausted, they departed camp III for the summit alone and with very little support in the upper camps.

They missed a scheduled radio call that night, but others in the expedition were tired and unable to mount a rescue. Three days later Mingma and Lhakpa Norbu Sherpa found their bodies next to a crevasse below camp IV. It was speculated that they fell on an ice slope near camp V, perhaps due to avalanche or rockfall.

A memorial fund, administered by the Mount Everest Foundation, was created in her memory. Its aim is "to provide grants to further British and Polish women's mountaineering in the world's greater ranges, ie: further afield than the Alps".

Personal life
In 1971 Chadwick-Onyszkiewicz married Polish mathematician and mountaineer Janusz Onyszkiewicz, her frequent climbing partner.

Notable climbs
 Mięguszowiecki Middle (first winter ascent)
 Gasherbrum III (first ascent)
 Noshaq, Hindu Kush

References

1942 births
1978 deaths
20th-century English women artists
Alumni of the Slade School of Fine Art
Artists from Birmingham, West Midlands
20th-century English painters
English women painters
English mountain climbers
Female climbers
Mountaineering deaths
Sport deaths in Nepal